Esporte Clube Pinheiros, abbreviated as E.C. Pinheiros,  is a handball club from São Paulo, Brazil. Currently, they compete in the Brazilian National League and it is the current champion.

Accomplishments
São Paulo State Championship: 31
1934, 1937, 1940, 1941, 1945, 1948, 1950, 1954, 1962, 1964, 1965, 1967, 1969–72, 1974, 1977, 1981, 1991, 1996–98, 2002, 2006, 2009, 2010, 2014, 2016,2017, 2022
Brazilian National League: 9
2007, 2009, 2010, 2011, 2012, 2015, 2017, 2018, 2020
Pan American Men's Club Handball Championship: 2
2011, 2017
South and Central American Men's Club Handball Championship: 1
2021
Participantions in the IHF Super Globe:
2011: 5th
2017: 5th
2021: 4th

Women's team
São Paulo State Championship: 5
2018, 2019, 2020, 2021, 2022
Liga Nacional Feminina: 3
2016, 2019, 2022
Pan American Women's Club Handball Championship: 1
2017
South and Central American Women's Club Handball Championship: 1
2022

Current squad
Squad for the 2021 IHF Super Globe

 02  Edney Silva Oliveira
 03  Fabio Lima Marques
 06  Lucas Cândido
 08  Arthur Flosi
 11  Gabriel Silva dos Reis
 13  Diogo Hubner
 16  Marcos Paulo Santos
 18  Guilherme Perbelini

 19  Phillipp Seifert
 23  Marcos Antonio da Silva
 24  Guilherme Valadão Gama
 25  Davi Langaro
 26  Hugo Monte dos Santos
 55  Caue Ceccon
 88  Tarcisio Freitas Oliveira
 99  Mateus Nascimento Martins

References

External links
EC Pinheiros Web Site

Esporte Clube Pinheiros
Brazilian handball clubs
Handball in Brazil
Sports teams in São Paulo (state)